The South Scott Street Historic District encompasses a small portion of a residential area south of downtown Little Rock, Arkansas.  It includes the 2400 block of South Scott Street, and one block of 24th Street just to its west.  Developed between about 1890 and 1950, this area has one of the city's best-preserved concentrations of modest middle-class residences from that period.  It includes fourteen buildings, ranging stylistically from the Queen Anne to the post-World War II vernacular.

The district was listed on the National Register of Historic Places in 1999.

See also

National Register of Historic Places listings in Little Rock, Arkansas

References

Historic districts in Little Rock, Arkansas
Historic districts on the National Register of Historic Places in Arkansas
Italianate architecture in Arkansas
Queen Anne architecture in Arkansas